Divish is a surname. Notable people with the surname include:

 Lukash Divish (born 1986), Russian volleyball player
 Ryan Divish, American sportswriter, blogger, and media personality